Barter Island LRRS Airport  is a public/military airport located near the city of Kaktovik on Barter Island, in the North Slope Borough,  located  east of Point Barrow, Alaska.  The airport is owned by the North Slope Borough. It is also known as Barter Island Airport or Kaktovik Airport. The acronym LRRS stands for Long Range Radar Site or Long Range Radar Station.

Facilities and aircraft 
Barter Island LRRS Airport has one runway designed 7/25 with a gravel surface measuring 4,820 by 100 feet (1,469 x 30 m). For the 12-month period ending December 31, 2005, the airport had 3,350 aircraft operations, an average of 9 per day: 75% air taxi, 24% general aviation and 1% military.

Airlines and destinations 

Prior to its bankruptcy and cessation of all operations, Ravn Alaska served the airport from multiple locations.

Statistics

History 
The original runway was built by the United States military in 1947. The U.S. Air Force assumed control of Barter Island in 1951 and extended the runway in 1953 to support the Distant Early Warning Line Radar station at Barter Island (BAR-MAIN).  The Barter Island DEW Line station was operated by civilian contract workers.  The DEW Line station was inactivated in 1990 and the station personnel were relieved of duty.

The radar station was upgraded with an AN/FPS-117 minimally attended Long Range surveillance radar in the winter of 1990.  A prototype AN/FPS-124 short-range radar was also installed.  The station was re-designated part of the North Warning System (NWS) as a Long Range Radar Site, A-21, being controlled by the Pacific Air Forces 611th Air Support Group, based at Elmendorf AFB.

In 1998 Pacific Air Forces initiated "Operation Clean Sweep", in which abandoned Cold War stations in Alaska were remediated and the land restored to its previous state. The site remediation of the radar and support station was carried out by the 611th Civil Engineering Squadron at Elmendorf, and remediation work was completed by 2005.

The airport remains open to support the small settlement at Kaktovik and to provide contractor support access to the military radar site.

Distant Early Warning Line support
The Barter Island station controlled a sector of the Distant Early Warning Line.  The BAR sector was composed of a series of surveillance radar stations along the North Slope of the Alaska Coast as well as stations in the Canadian Yukon and Northwest Territories.

Barter Island controlled nine manned stations, four of them being classified as "auxiliary" sites and five "intermediate" stations.  The auxiliary stations were similar to the main site at Barter Island; the intermediate sites had less personnel at them.  The stations were made up of an AN/FPS-19 search radar, a high power L-Band radar consisting of two identical radar sets feeding a dual (back to back) antenna with a range of about 160 nautical miles.  The sites had one 25-man module building for personnel who supported the radar, and an airstrip, although the length and capacity varied greatly, making frequent risky landings necessary at some sites.

Each of the sites was staffed by civilian contract workers who had signed 18-month contracts, although they were visited by Air Force military personnel frequently.

With the signing of the North American Air Defence Modernization agreement at the "Shamrock Summit" between Prime Minister Mulroney and President Reagan in Quebec City on 18 March 1985, the DEW Line began its eventual upgrading and transition becoming the North Warning System (NWS) of today.  The intermediate sites were closed in 1963 due to the advancements in radar technology.  Operational NWS sites have retained their former DEW Line designations.  The Canadian NWS sites are under the jurisdiction of the NORAD Canada West ROCC at CFB North Bay Ontario; Barter Island is under the jurisdiction of the Alaska NORAD Region ROCC at Elmendorf AFB.

See also
 North Warning System
 Distant Early Warning Line
 Alaskan Air Command
 Eleventh Air Force

References

External links 
  The DEW Line
 Barter Island (BAR-Main) page from The DEW LINE: Sites in Canada, Alaska and Greenland
 Airport diagram (GIF) from Federal Aviation Administration, Alaska Region
 

Airports in North Slope Borough, Alaska
Airports established in 1947
1947 establishments in Alaska